Pühajärv ("Holy lake") is a lake in Estonia, near the town of Otepää. The Väike Emajõgi river flows out of the lake.

See also

List of lakes of Estonia

Lakes of Estonia
Otepää Parish
Lakes of Valga County
Tourist attractions in Valga County